The Swatch FIVB World Tour 2005 was the official international beach volleyball tour for 2005.

Grand Slam
There were three Grand Slam tournaments. These events give a higher number of points and more money than the rest of the tournaments.

Stavanger, NorwayConocoPhillips Grand Slam, June 28 - July 3, 2005
Paris, FranceBeach Volleyball Paris-Ile de France Grand Slam, July 26–31, 2005
Klagenfurt, AustriaA1 Grand Slam presented by Nokia, August 3–7, 2005

Tournament results

Women

Men

Medal table by country

References

Beach Volleyball Database

External links
2005 Swatch FIVB World Tour - tour calendar at FIVB.org

 
 

2005 in beach volleyball
2005